Hainablak Glacier is a glacier near Trango Tower mountain in Baltistan, Gilgit-Baltistan, Pakistan.

See also
Trango Glacier
Trango Towers
List of mountains in Pakistan
List of highest mountains
List of glaciers

References 

Glaciers of Gilgit-Baltistan
Baltistan